Pachytheca are fossils of ancient plants, dating from the upper Silurian to the lower Devonian.

External links
 Pachytheca, a peculiar, vegetable little sphere

Silurian plants
Early Devonian plants
Enigmatic plant taxa
Silurian first appearances
Early Devonian genus extinctions
Paleozoic life of New Brunswick
Paleozoic life of Quebec